Fraternization (from Latin frater meaning "brother") is the act of establishing intimate relations between people or groups. It is generally used to refer to establishing relations that are considered ethically or morally wrong or inappropriate.
 
In many institutional contexts (such as militaries, diplomatic corps, parliaments, prisons, law enforcement or police, schools, sports teams, gangs and corporations) fraternization transgresses legal, moral, or professional norms forbidding certain categories of social contact across socially or legally defined classes. The term often tends to connote impropriety, unprofessionalism or a lack of ethics.

For example, "fraternization with the enemy" refers to associations with members of enemy groups and suggests a serious conflict of strong, deep, and close romantic interest and attraction, if not the possibility of treason, "fraternization with civilians" typically suggests transgression of norms forbidding non-civilians and civilians from forming close nonprofessional relationships (such as romantically or platonically); and "fraternization of officers with enlisted personnel" or "seniors with their juniors" (the usual meaning in a military context) describes associations that are implied to be irregular, unprofessional, improper, or imprudent in ways that negatively affect the members and goals of the organization.

Many institutions worldwide implement policies forbidding forms of fraternization for many specific reasons. Fraternization may be forbidden to maintain image and morale, to protect and ensure fair and uniform treatment of subordinates, to maintain organizational integrity and the ability to achieve operational goals, and to prevent unauthorized transfers of information. Relations and activities forbidden under anti-fraternization policies may be romantic and sexual liaisons, gambling and ongoing business relationships, insubordination, or excessive familiarity and disrespect of rank.

Views on fraternization are mixed and may depend on the relations and classes under discussion. Organizations may relax, change, or reinforce restrictions to reflect changes in the prevailing organizational view or doctrine regarding fraternization. Within an in-group fraternization may lead to friendship and self actualization.

Military 

Within militaries, officers and members of enlisted ranks are typically prohibited from personally associating outside their professional duties and orders. Excessively familiar relationships between officers of different ranks may also be considered fraternization, especially between officers in the same chain of command. The reasons for anti-fraternization policies within modern militaries often include the maintenance of discipline and the chain of command and the prevention of the spreading of military secrets to enemies, which may amount to treason or sedition under military law. If a fighting force has officers unwilling to put certain enlisted personnel at risk or if enlisted soldiers believe that their selection for a perceived suicide mission is not motivated solely by a coldly impartial assessment of military strategy (to sacrifice some units so that the force as a whole will prevail), the enlisted soldiers may fail to provide the unhesitating obedience necessary to the realization of that strategy or may even attack their superiors.

The Christmas Truce was a notable instance of fraternization in World War I.

Allied occupation of Germany
 
To impress the German people with the Allied opinion of them, a strict non-fraternization policy was adhered to by General Dwight Eisenhower and the Department of War during World War II. However, because of pressure from the US State Department and Congress, the policy was lifted in stages.

In June 1945, the prohibition against speaking with German children was made less strict. In July, it became possible to speak to German adults in certain circumstances. In September, the policy was abandoned in Austria and Germany.

In the earliest stages of the occupation, US soldiers were not allowed to pay maintenance for a child they admitted having fathered since to do so was considered as "aiding the enemy". Marriages between US soldiers and Austrian women were not permitted until January 1946 and with German women until December 1946.

The British military had a similar ban in place for their troops during the Allied occupation. The War Office notably published that German women "will be willing, if they can get the chance, to make themselves cheap for what they can get out of you" in its handbook distributed to soldiers stationed in Germany. In spite of the ban, soldiers still knowingly had contact with local women, especially civilian employees. Field Marshal Bernard Montgomery, Eisenhower's counterpart, was against the ban, and it was lifted in July 1945.

Education 
Many schools and universities prohibit certain relationships between teachers/lecturers and students to avoid favoritism, coercion, sexual harassment, and/or sex crimes enabled by the teacher's position of authority. The prohibitions are controversial, however, as they may come into conflict with rules on tenure, for example, if unethical conduct is suspected but not confirmed.

Workplace 
Court decisions in some US states have allowed employers a limited legal right to enforce non-fraternization policies among employees, forbidding them to maintain certain kinds of relationships with one another. Since the 1990s, such corporate policies have been increasingly adopted in the United States in the pursuit of objectives such as protecting professionalism and workplace productivity, promoting gender equality and women's rights, or avoiding and mitigating the impact of sexual harassment lawsuits. The decisions and the policies they protect have, however, been criticized on various grounds: as illegitimate constraints on individual freedom of association, as tools for companies to punish participation in labor unions, and as expressions of overzealous political correctness.

Professional and college-level sports teams in the US have enacted anti-fraternization policies between athletes and cheerleaders. Very few American football teams allow casual contacts between players and cheerleaders. Reasons include interference with concentration, potential fallout for the images of teams, the possibility of sex crimes or sexual harassment, and attendant legal liability.

See also 
 Blood brother
 Interpersonal relationship 
 Friendship
 Christmas truce
 Socialization

References

External links 
US military policies on fraternization
US armed services fraternization policies
New York Assembly policy prohibiting fraternization with student interns
The Church of Greece on Adelphopoiia
Fraternization and the Uncensored Occupation book chapter by Ann Elizabeth Pfau

Interpersonal relationships